Roberto Soundy (4 March 1900 – 5 October 1990) was a Salvadoran sports shooter. He competed in the trap event at the 1968 Summer Olympics.

References

1900 births
1990 deaths
Salvadoran male sport shooters
Olympic shooters of El Salvador
Shooters at the 1968 Summer Olympics
Sportspeople from San Salvador